Moroccan may refer to:

 Something or someone from, or related to the country of Morocco
 Moroccan people
 Moroccan Arabic, spoken in Morocco
 Moroccan Jews

See also 
 Morocco leather
 
 

Language and nationality disambiguation pages